Test-Tube Conceived is a 1986 album by English singer and musician Robert Calvert.

Track listing
All titles written by Robert Calvert.

Side one
"Invitro Breed" - 4:24
"The Rah Rah Man" - 3:27
"Telekinesis" - 3:17
"I Hear Voices" - 5:39
"Fanfare for the Perfect Race" - 3:53

Side two
"On Line" - 4:20
"Save Them From the Scientists" - 3:36
"Fly on the Wall" - 3:58
"Thanks to the Scientists" - 5:23
"Test-Tube Conceived" - 4:22

Bonus track
"Test-Tube Conceived" (live, November 3, 1986)

Personnel
Bob Calvert – vocals, synthesizer, drum programming, percussion, guitar
Dave Anderson – bass
Martin Holdcroft – guitars, drum programming, keyboards, tape loops
Julie Wareing - backing vocals
Brian Snelling – additional keyboards, engineer

Release history
April 1986: UK, Demi Monde (DMLP1010), vinyl
August 1987: UK, The CD label (CDTL007), CD
1996: UK, Thunderbolt (CDTB113), CD
August 2003: UK, Voiceprint Records (VP273CD), CD with bonus track

References

External links
 aural-innovations.com – lyrics

1985 albums
Robert Calvert albums